Megalophanes is a genus of moths belonging to the family Psychidae.

The species of this genus are found in Europe.

Species:
 Megalophanes brachycornis Kozhantshikov, 1956 
 Megalophanes stetinensis (Hering, 1846) 
 Megalophanes turatii (Staudinger, 1877) 
 Megalophanes viciella (Denis & Schiffermuller, 1775)

References

Psychidae
Psychidae genera